Bessmennyy ("Inquisitive") was a Project 1135M Burevestnik-class ("Petrel") Guard Ship (SKR) or 'Krivak II'-class frigate that served with the Soviet and Russian Navies. The vessel was the seventh of the class to enter service. Launched on 17 September 1977, Bessmennyy was designed to operate as an anti-submarine vessel with the Northern Fleet, using an armament built around the Metel Anti-Ship Complex. Following the dissolution of the Soviet Union, in 1991, the ship was transferred to the Russian Navy and took part in a pioneering visit to Gibraltar two years later, the first time that Russian warships had visited the territory in living memory. Bessmennyy was retired on 16 March 1998, disarmed and subsequently broken up.

Design and development
Bessmennyy was one of eleven Project 1135M ships launched between 1975 and 1981. Project 1135, the Burevestnik ("Petrel") class, was envisaged by the Soviet Navy as a less expensive complement to the Project 1134A Berkut A (NATO reporting name 'Kresta II') and Project 1134B Berkut B (NATO reporting name 'Kara') classes of anti-submarine ships. Project 1135M was an improvement developed in 1972 with slightly increased displacement and heavier guns compared with the basic 1135. The design, by N. P. Sobolov, combined a powerful missile armament with good seakeeping for a blue water role. The ships were designated Guard Ship (SKR) to reflect their substantial greater anti-ship capability than the earlier members of the class, and the Soviet strategy of creating protected areas for friendly submarines close to the coast. NATO forces called the vessels 'Krivak II'-class frigates.

Power was provided by two  M7K power sets, each consisting of a combination of a  DK59 and a  M62 gas turbine arranged in a COGAG installation and driving one fixed-pitch propeller. The ship’s complement was 194, including 23 officers.

Armament and sensors
Bessmennyy was designed for anti-submarine warfare around four URPK-5 Rastrub missiles (NATO reporting name SS-N-14 'Silex'), backed up by a pair of quadruple launchers for  torpedoes and a pair of RBU-6000  Smerch-2 anti-submarine rocket launchers. Both the URPK-5 and the torpedoes also had anti-ship capabilities. Defence against aircraft was provided by forty 4K33 OSA-M (SA-N-4 'Gecko') surface to air missiles which were launched from two twin-arm ZIF-122 launchers. Two  AK-100 guns were mounted aft in a superfiring arrangement.

The ship had a well-equipped sensor suite, including a single MR-310A Angara-A air/surface search radar, Don navigation radar, the MP-401S Start-S ESM radar system and the Spectrum-F laser warning system. Fire control for the guns was provided by a MR-143 Lev-214 radar. The vessel was also equipped with the PK-16 decoy-dispenser system which used chaff as a form of missile defense.

Construction and career
Laid down by on 1 November 1977 with the yard number 165 at the Yantar Shipyard in Kaliningrad, Bessmennyy was launched on 9 August 1978. The ship was the seventh of the newer Project 1135M 'Krivak-II' class built at the yard. The vessel, named for a Russian word that can be translated as permanent, was commissioned on 26 December and joined the Northern Fleet. On 10 November 1982, the ship took part in an amphibious assault exercise with other members of the Soviet Navy,

With the dissolution of the Soviet Union on 26 December 1991, Bessmennyy was transferred to the Russian Navy. It was the first time in living memory that Russian vessels had visited the territory and the crews took part in various activities with sailors from the Royal Navy, including ten pin bowling. Afterwards, the ship was to have joined a joint exercise in the Mediterranean Sea, but instead was sent to the Suez Canal to support the release of a Russian tug.

After nearly twenty years in service, Bessmennyy was decommissioned on 16 March 1998, disarmed and broken up.

References

Citations

Bibliography

 
 
 
 
 
 
 
 
 
 
 

1978 ships
Cold War frigates of the Soviet Union
Krivak-class frigates
Krivak-class frigates of the Russian Navy
Ships built at Yantar Shipyard
Ships built in the Soviet Union